Eucosma sombreana is a species of moth of the family Tortricidae. It is found in North America, where it has been recorded from South Carolina and Oklahoma to Iowa, Illinois and Ontario.

The wingspan is 19–25 mm. The forewings are brownish-grey, dusted with pale scales. There is a faint, slightly paler oblique band in the median area, bordered on both sides by dark shading. The hindwings are slightly paler than the forewing. Adults are on wing from June to October.

References

Moths described in 1905
Eucosmini